Merry Elisabeth Scheel (26 September 1929, Aarhus - 2 November 2007) was one of Denmark's most prominent nursing theorists. She received several degrees in her life, including a nursing degree in 1960, and a PhD in 2003. For many years, she was an active writer, especially around the ethical and philosophical aspects of the nursing profession.

References

Scheel ME (2005): ”Interaktionel sygeplejepraksis”. 3. udgave, Munksgaard Danmark, København.
Liljehult J (2006): "Tværfagligheds betydning for patientplejen". FAS, Hillerød.

1929 births
2007 deaths
People from Aarhus
Danish nurses
20th-century Danish writers
Nursing theorists
20th-century Danish women writers